Guo Fan (born December 10, 1985 in Xindu 新度, Licheng District, Putian, Fujian) is a Chinese track and field athlete who specialises in sprinting.

See also 
China at the 2012 Summer Olympics - Athletics
Athletics at the 2012 Summer Olympics – Men's 4 × 100 metres relay

References 

Living people
1985 births
Chinese male sprinters
Runners from Fujian
Athletes (track and field) at the 2012 Summer Olympics
Olympic athletes of China
People from Putian